Macroglossum stenoxanthum is a moth of the  family Sphingidae. It is known from northern Queensland.

References

Macroglossum
Moths described in 1925